The Women's 7.5 kilometre sprint biathlon competition at the 2006 Winter Olympics in Turin, Italy was held on 16 February, at Cesana San Sicario. Competitors raced over three loops of a 2.5 kilometre skiing course, shooting ten times, five prone and five standing. Each miss required a competitor to ski a 150-metre penalty loop.

Uschi Disl was the defending World Champion at the sprint, while Kati Wilhelm won the sprint at the trial event in 2005, despite shooting two penalty laps. Wilhelm is also defending Olympic champion, and entered the games leading the sprint World Cup ahead of Disl and Russian Svetlana Ishmouratova.

Results

References

Women's biathlon at the 2006 Winter Olympics